The following is a list of ships operated by the White Star Line.

1846–1869

1870–1889

1890–1899

1900–1909

1910–1919

1920–1932

References

Bibliography

External links
The White Star Sailing Packets'', Captain E. A. Woods

Ships of the White Star Line